Tanveer Ahmed (born 15 April 1976) is a retired Pakistani footballer, who is the former captain of WAPDA. He is also the former captain of Pakistan national football team. A mainstay in the national team, the experienced defender has played in many tournaments since his first call up. Since 2012, Ahmed has been the assistant coach at WAPDA.

Ahmed is a central defender who has been playing for WAPDA since he transferred there in 2002 season. He is also a useful right back. Ahmed started his career at Pak Punjab Football Club Faisalabad, Ahmed selected for CMF F.C. where his defensive ability was brought to attention and soon was called up to the national team. 

When Ahmed moved to WAPDA, he was given the captaincy and won the National Championship in 2003. In the new Pakistan Premier League in 2004, WAPDA were one of the favourites to win the title, but it took until the final day of the season before they were crowned champions. They lost the PPL the following year.

He also captained Lahore Lajpaals F.C. in the inaugural Geo Super Football League 2007 in defense where he was a semi-finalist with the team.

After retiring from international football after the 2010 World Cup qualifiers in 2007, Ahmed became WAPDA Assistant Manager as well as retaining his squad player status, and helped them with the 2007–08 Pakistan Premier League. However, as a result of these displays on and off the pitch, Tanveer Ahmed was once again called back to the national squad for the AFC Challenge Cup 2008 qualifiers by head coach Akhtar Mohiuddin. After failing to reach the AFC Challenge Cup he retired again.

International Career Stats

Goals for Senior National Team

Honours

WAPDA
National Championship/Pakistan Premier League: 2003, 2004–05, 2007–08

References

External links
Tanveer Ghani

1976 births
Living people
Pakistani footballers
Pakistan international footballers
WAPDA F.C. players
Pakistani football managers
Footballers at the 2002 Asian Games
Footballers at the 2006 Asian Games

Association football defenders
Asian Games competitors for Pakistan